Rush County (standard abbreviation: RH) is a county located in the U.S. state of Kansas. As of the 2020 census, the county population was 2,956. The largest city and county seat is La Crosse.

History

Early history

For many millennia, the Great Plains of North America was inhabited by nomadic Native Americans.  From the 16th century to 18th century, the Kingdom of France claimed ownership of large parts of North America.  In 1762, after the French and Indian War, France secretly ceded New France to Spain, per the Treaty of Fontainebleau.

19th century
In 1802, Spain returned most of the land to France, but keeping title to about 7,500 square miles.  In 1803, most of the land for modern day Kansas was acquired by the United States from France as part of the 828,000 square mile Louisiana Purchase for 2.83 cents per acre.

In 1854, the Kansas Territory was organized, then in 1861 Kansas became the 34th U.S. state.  In 1867, Rush County was established.  Rush County was organized on December 5, 1874. There was a county seat struggle between La Crosse and Rush Center lasting 10 years until La Crosse finally became the county seat.

20th century
The first county fair was held in 1910 south of Rush Center.

21st century
In 2015, the "Alexander Wind Farm" was constructed south of Alexander.  It cost about $85 million and generates 48 megawatts of power.

Geography

It is intersected by Walnut Creek, a tributary of the Arkansas River, and watered by other streams.

Adjacent counties
 Ellis County (north)
 Russell County (northeast)
 Barton County (east)
 Pawnee County (south)
 Ness County (west)

Demographics

As of the census of 2000, there were 3,551 people, 1,548 households, and 1,013 families residing in the county.  The population density was 5 people per square mile (2/km2).  There were 1,928 housing units at an average density of 3 per square mile (1/km2).  The racial makeup of the county was 98.45% White, 0.31% Black or African American, 0.42% Native American, 0.11% Asian, 0.17% from other races, and 0.54% from two or more races.  1.04% of the population were Hispanic or Latino of any race.

There were 1,548 households, out of which 26.60% had children under the age of 18 living with them, 56.10% were married couples living together, 5.80% had a female householder with no husband present, and 34.50% were non-families. 31.70% of all households were made up of individuals, and 18.00% had someone living alone who was 65 years of age or older.  The average household size was 2.24 and the average family size was 2.80.

In the county, the population was spread out, with 22.10% under the age of 18, 5.50% from 18 to 24, 22.90% from 25 to 44, 24.20% from 45 to 64, and 25.30% who were 65 years of age or older.  The median age was 45 years. For every 100 females there were 94.40 males.  For every 100 females age 18 and over, there were 90.60 males.

The median income for a household in the county was $31,268, and the median income for a family was $38,821. Males had a median income of $25,408 versus $20,307 for females. The per capita income for the county was $18,033.  About 6.70% of families and 9.70% of the population were below the poverty line, including 12.50% of those under age 18 and 9.90% of those age 65 or over.

Government

Presidential elections

Rush County is presently overwhelmingly Republican, although as recently as 1988 Michael Dukakis, aided by a major Great Plains drought, came within 25 votes of carrying the county for the Democrats.

Laws
Rush County was a prohibition, or "dry," county until the Kansas Constitution was amended in 1986 and voters approved the sale of alcoholic liquor by the individual drink with a 30 percent food sales requirement.

Education

Unified school districts
 La Crosse USD 395
 Otis-Bison USD 403

Communities

Cities

 Alexander
 Bison
 La Crosse
 Liebenthal
 McCracken
 Otis
 Rush Center
 Timken

Unincorporated communities
 Hargrave
 Loretta
 Nekoma
 Schaffer

Townships
Rush County is divided into twelve townships.  None of the cities within the county are considered governmentally independent, and all figures for the townships include those of the cities.  In the following table, the population center is the largest city (or cities) included in that township's population total, if it is of a significant size.

Former townships
 West Point, Kansas

See also

References

Further reading

 Plat book of Rush County, Kansas; North West Publishing Co; 33 pages; 1901.

External links

County
 
 Rush County - Directory of Public Officials
Historical
 History of Cities in Rush County
Maps
 Rush County Maps: Current, Historic, KDOT
 Kansas Highway Maps: Current, Historic, KDOT
 Kansas Railroad Maps: Current, 1996, 1915, KDOT and Kansas Historical Society

 
Kansas counties
1867 establishments in Kansas
Populated places established in 1867